Kelebia is a  village in Bács-Kiskun county, in the Southern Great Plain region of southern Hungary. The railway crossing into the Serbian province of Vojvodina is located here.

Croats in Hungary call this village Kelebija.

History 

The border drawn in 1918 split one village into two countries, Hungary and Kingdom of Serbs, Croats and Slovenes. Today, the municipalities are called Kelebia in Hungary and Kelebija in Serbia.

Geography

References

External links 
 Kelebia Község Honlapja Főoldal

Divided cities
Populated places in Bács-Kiskun County
Hungary–Serbia border crossings